Jean-Marc van Tol (born 6 July 1967, Rotterdam) is a cartoonist. He is the winner of the 2004 Stripschapprijs for Fokke & Sukke, with John Reid and Bastiaan Geleijnse. He also played in the Dutch TV-series Wie is de mol.

References

1967 births
Living people
Dutch comics artists
Dutch comics writers
Dutch editorial cartoonists
Dutch satirists
Artists from Rotterdam
Winners of the Stripschapsprijs